The Jean Monnet House, sometimes referred to as Houjarray for the hamlet in which it is located, is a country farmhouse in Bazoches-sur-Guyonne, Yvelines, near Montfort-l'Amaury about 27 miles west of Paris. Jean Monnet purchased the house and surrounding land in 1945, upon his return to France after living abroad since June 1940. Monnet mostly lived there until his death in 1979, except in 1952-1955 when he headed the European Coal and Steel Community's High Authority in Luxembourg. Since 1982, the house has been owned and managed by the European Parliament.

History

Monnet habitually took long morning walks in the forest surrounding the home, before being chauffeured to Paris where he had his office, at the General Planning Commission from 1946 to 1952 and at the Action Committee for the United States of Europe from 1955 to 1976.

Some of the foundational ideas of Europe were considered and created at the house, including the May 1950 Schuman Declaration which Robert Schuman would present as a proposal for the creation of the European Coal and Steel Community. That declaration, which created the foundation for the development of the European Community, was drafted at the house by Monnet and his aides in late April 1950.

Over the years, many important political figures, including Robert Schuman, Walter Hallstein, Paul-Henri Spaak, Konrad Adenauer, and René Pleven, visited Jean Monnet's home and discussed politics and the potential for a common future in Europe. Jean Monnet invited his friends, including Dwight D. Eisenhower, George Ball, and Edward Heath, visiting Paris to join him at his farmhouse on Sundays. Journalists, including the likes of Walter Lippmann, Hubert Beuve-Méry and his neighbor , also visited Monnet at his home for long conversations. Monnet would ritually regale his guests with the family cognac.

In 1982, the European Parliament, considering that the Monnet House was a common heritage of Europeans, bought the house and subsequently refurbished it as a memorial to Monnet. From 1990 to 2018, the European Parliament delegated the house's management to the Jean Monnet Association, created in 1986 and initially chaired by Étienne Hirsch. The European Parliament also built a small conference center next to the house, named after Hans-Gert Pöttering and inaugurated in 2008.

Description

The house includes a ground floor, with displays aiming to recreate their state during Monnet's lifetime, and a first floor, which hosts a permanent exhibition about Monnet's life and role in European history. A wide and open garden slopes down from the house.

See also
  in Rhöndorf, Bad Honnef, Germany
 Casa Alcide de Gasperi museum in Pieve Tesino, Italy
  in Scy-Chazelles, France

References

Houses in France
Historic houses
Jean Monnet